Carol Theresa East (born 15 January 1959, Kingston, Jamaica), known by her stage name of Sister Carol, is a Jamaican-born American reggae recording artist. She has used many other stage names, including Black Cinderella (also the name of her record label) and Mother Culture.

Biography
Originally from the Denham Town district of West Kingston, she was 14 when her family emigrated to Brooklyn, New York.

Her father Howard East was a Senior Engineer with Radio Jamaica and contributed to recording sessions as Studio One. She became involved in the Jamaican music scene herself. She earned a degree in education from the City College of New York in 1981, the same year she gave birth to her first child. Around that time she met Brigadier Jerry, a Jamaican DJ, who encouraged her to try DJ chatting in Jamaican dancehall style, rather than singing.

After winning competitions in New York and Jamaica, she toured with The Meditations. Her first album, Liberation for Africa, was released in 1983, as a limited edition on the Jamaican SG label. The 1984 album Black Cinderella established her. She formed her own record label, also called Black Cinderella. Jah Disciple followed in 1989.

East has appeared in the Jonathan Demme movies Something Wild (1986), Married to the Mob (1988), and Rachel Getting Married (2008). Demme featured East's songs in Ricki and the Flash (2015).

Personal life
In the 2000s she returned to Jamaica, living in St. Ann. Her daughter Nakeeba Amaniyea is a deejay.

Discography
Liberation For Africa (1983), Serious Gold
Black Cinderella (1984), Jah Life
Jah Disciple (1989), RAS
Mother Culture (1991), RAS
Call Mi Sister Carol (1994), Heartbeat
Lyrically Potent (1996), Heartbeat
Potent Dub (1997), Heartbeat
Isis - The Original Rasta Womb-man (1999), Tuff Gong
Direct Hit! (2001), Catapult
Empressive (2003), M10
1Derful Words (2006), Black Cinderella
Togetherness (2012) - Sister Carol & Friends
Live No Evil (2014), Black Cinderella

References

External links
 
 Sister Carol profile, music.yahoo.com; Retrieved 6 June 2017.

1959 births
Living people
Musicians from Kingston, Jamaica
Jamaican dancehall musicians
Jamaican songwriters
20th-century Jamaican women singers
Jamaican emigrants to the United States
City College of New York alumni
Jamaican reggae singers
Easy Star Records artists
21st-century Jamaican women singers